Guwahati College of Architecture (GCA) is an institute of higher education located in Guwahati, Assam, India. It was established in 2006 to provide the skills for a career in architecture.

The college collaborates with CEPT University, running a student and teacher exchange program. GCA participates in the Pidilite Award for excellence

Courses
Two courses in architecture are available from the college:
Bachelor of Architecture (B.Arch) – 5 years
Master of Architecture (M.Arch) – 2 years

Campus
Guwahati College of Architecture is located on Zoo Road, in west Guwahati. The 1 million square foot campus includes a library, 550-seat lecture theatre, two workshops, sports facilities and a computer lab. Wi-Fi internet connection is available across the campus. Classrooms make use of modern technology such as digital drawing studios.

References

External links
Official GCA website 
 Official GCA Facebook page
Official GCA Youtube page

Architecture schools in India
Universities and colleges in Guwahati
Educational institutions established in 2006
2006 establishments in Assam